Marc Jurado Gómez (born 13 April 2004) is a Spanish footballer who plays as a right-back for Premier League club Manchester United.

Early life
Born in Sabadell, Catalonia, Jurado started his career at the age of four, with local side Can Rull. He was noticed by a Barcelona scout for his goal-scoring ability. However, Jurado wanted to switch to handball to play as a goalkeeper, as well as stay with Can Rull to be with his friends, and rejected Barcelona's initial advances.

Club career

Early career
After giving the offer some consideration, Jurado ended his three-year spell with Can Rull and joined Barcelona's youth academy in 2011. Early into his career with Barcelona, he scored one of the quickest goals ever scored by the Spanish club at any level - notching a goal after 5 seconds against Viladecans.

Manchester United
In May 2020, Jurado began being strongly linked with English Premier League side Manchester United, having rejected the offer of a contract extension at Barcelona. He announced his departure from the Catalan club at the end of June, further fuelling rumours of his move to the Red Devils. Eventually, after a delay in paperwork being finalised, the signing was completed, and Jurado was announced as a Manchester United player in September 2020.

He signed his first professional contract with United in April 2021.

International career
Jurado was called up to the Spain under-17 side on 25 May 2021 for the trainings in May. Jurado was called up to the Spain under-18 side on 15 February 2022 for the friendly match against Denmark.

He made his under-19 debut in 2022, and in the same year was promoted to the under-20 side.

Style of play
A natural right-back, noted for his good awareness, positional sense and pace, Jurado can also operate further up the right flank as a winger.

Career statistics

Club

Honours
Manchester United U18
FA Youth Cup: 2021–22

References

2004 births
Living people
Sportspeople from Sabadell
Spanish footballers
Spain youth international footballers
Association football defenders
FC Barcelona players
Manchester United F.C. players
Spanish expatriate footballers
Spanish expatriate sportspeople in England
Expatriate footballers in England
21st-century Spanish people